Inderhavnsbroen (lit.: The Inner Harbour Bridge) is a bridge across the Copenhagen inner harbour and is a  combined pedestrian and bicyclist bridge directed east-west. The bridge is joined to Nyhavn (west) and Christianshavn (east).

The bridge was designed by Flint & Neill with Studio Bednarski and Hardesty & Hanover, and opened to the public on 7 July 2016.

The design includes a bulge that requires cyclists to make a sharp turn. This feature has attracted criticism.

See also
 Lacey V. Murrow Memorial Bridge, a similar bridge that also had a "bulge" associated with at least one fatal incident

References

Bridges in Copenhagen
Cyclist bridges in Denmark
Pedestrian bridges in Denmark
Port of Copenhagen
Bridges completed in 2016
2016 establishments in Denmark